Pleasant Lake is a  lake located in Rockingham County in central New Hampshire, United States, in the town of Deerfield. The eastern shore of the lake forms the boundary between Deerfield and the town of Northwood. Water from Pleasant Lake flows north to Northwood Lake, then west via the Little Suncook River to the Suncook River, a tributary of the Merrimack River.

The lake is classified as a cold- and warmwater fishery, with observed species including brown trout, rainbow trout, smallmouth and largemouth bass, chain pickerel, brown bullhead, and white perch.

See also

List of lakes in New Hampshire

References

Lakes of Rockingham County, New Hampshire